Jean-Claude Larrieu (20 September 1943) is a French cinematographer.

He has collaborated with the Spanish director Isabel Coixet on numerous occasions.

Filmography 
 Le Crime d'amour (1982) - Guy Gilles
 Un amour à Paris (1988) - Merzak Allouache 
 Bille en tête (1989) - Carlo Cotti
 J'aurais jamais dû croiser son regard (1989) - Jean-Marc Longval
 Mauvaise fille (1991) - Régis Franc
 Coming to Terms with the Dead (1994) - Pascale Ferran
 Le Garçu (1995) - Maurice Pialat
 Restons groupés (1998) - Jean-Paul Salomé
 Le Bleu des villes (1999) - Stéphane Brizé
 My Life Without Me (2003) - Isabel Coixet
 Le Ventre de Juliette (2003) - Martin Provost
 Viva Laldjérie (2003) - Nadir Moknèche
 Habana Blues (2005) - Benito Zambrano
 Paris, je t'aime - segment Bastille (2006) - Isabel Coixet
 The Secret Life of Words (2006) - Isabel Coixet
 Comme les autres (2008) - Vincent Garenq
 Elegy (2008) - Isabel Coixet
 Queen to Play (2009) - Caroline Bottaro
 Map of the Sounds of Tokyo (2009) - Isabel Coixet
 The Women on the 6th Floor (2011) - Philippe Le Guay
 Bicycling with Molière (2013) - Philippe Le Guay
 Another Me (2013) - Isabel Coixet
 Floride (2015) - Philippe Le Guay
 Nobody Wants the Night (2015) - Isabel Coixet
 Julieta (2016) - Pedro Almodóvar
 The Bookshop (2017) - Isabel Coixet
 It Snows in Benidorm (2020) - Isabel Coixet

Distinctions 
 2004 Círculo de Escritores Cinematográficos (Spanish film writers circle) awards: Best Cinematography nomination for My Life Without Me
 2006 Círculo de Escritores Cinematográficos awards: Best Cinematography prize for The Secret Life of Words
 2015 Goya Award for Best Cinematography: nomination for Nobody Wants the Night.

References

External links 
 
 Jean-Claude Larrieu within AFC's website

1943 births
Living people
French cinematographers
People from Hautes-Pyrénées